In fluid dynamics, Beltrami flows are flows in which the vorticity vector  and the velocity vector  are parallel to each other. In other words, Beltrami flow is a flow where Lamb vector is zero. It is named after the Italian mathematician Eugenio Beltrami due to his derivation of the Beltrami vector field, while initial developments in fluid dynamics were done by the Russian scientist Ippolit S. Gromeka in 1881.

Description

Since the vorticity vector  and the velocity vector  are parallel to each other, we can write

where  is some scalar function. One immediate consequence of Beltrami flow is that it can never be a planar or axisymmetric  flow because in those flows, vorticity is always perpendicular to the velocity field. The other important consequence will be realized by looking at the incompressible vorticity equation

Thus Beltrami flows satisfies the linear equation

When , the components of vorticity satisfies a simple heat equation.

Trkalian flow

Viktor Trkal considered the Beltrami flows without any external forces in 1919 for the scalar function , i.e.,

Introduce the following separation of variables

then the equation satisfied by  becomes

The Chandrasekhar–Kendall functions satisfy this equation.

Berker's solution

Generalized Beltrami flow

The generalized Beltrami flow satisfies the condition

which is less restrictive than the Beltrami condition . Unlike the normal Beltrami flows, the generalized Beltrami flow can be studied for planar and axisymmetric flows.

Steady planar flows

For steady generalized Beltrami flow, we have  and since it is also planar we have . Introduce the stream function

Integration of  gives . So, complete solution is possible if it satisfies all the following three equations

A special case is considered when the flow field has uniform vorticity . Wang (1991) gave the generalized solution as

Substituting this into the vorticity equation and introducing the separation of variables  with the separating constant  results in

The solution obtained for different choices of  can be interpreted differently, for example,  represents a flow downstream a uniform grid,  represents a flow created by a stretching plate,  represents a flow into a corner,  represents an Asymptotic suction profile etc.

Unsteady planar flows

Here,
 .

Taylor's decaying vortices

G. I. Taylor gave the solution for a special case where , where  is a constant in 1923.  He showed that the separation  satisfies the equation and also

Taylor also considered an example, a decaying system of eddies rotating alternatively in opposite directions and arranged in a rectangular array

Therefore, this system of eddies decays as

O. Walsh generalized Taylor's eddy solution in 1992. Walsh's solution is of the form , where  and

Steady axisymmetric flows

Here we have . Integration of  gives  and the three equations are

The first equation is the Hicks equation.

A simple set of solutions to the above equation is

 represents a flow due to two opposing rotational stream on a parabolic surface,  represents rotational flow on a plane wall,  represents a flow ellipsoidal vortex (special case – Hill's spherical vortex),  represents a type of toroidal vortex etc.

where  are the Bessel function of the first kind and Bessel function of the second kind respectively. A special case of the above solution is Poiseuille flow for cylindrical geometry with transpiration velocities on the walls. Chia-Shun Yih found a solution in 1958 for Poiseuille flow into a sink when .

See also

Gromeka–Arnold–Beltrami–Childress (GABC) flow

References

Fluid dynamics